302 Squadron may refer to:
 302nd Tactical Fighter Squadron (JASDF), Japan
 No. 302 Polish Fighter Squadron
 302 Squadron (Portugal)
 302 Squadron (Royal Netherlands Air Force)
 302nd Fighter Squadron, United States